Mdandu is a town and ward in Wanging'ombe District of Njombe Region in the southern highlands of Tanzania, East Africa. As of 2002, the population of the ward was 26,149.

References

Wards of Iringa Region